Sunette Stella Viljoen (born 6 October 1983) is a South African sportswoman who has represented her country in both cricket and athletics. In athletics, she competes as a javelin thrower and has won an Olympic silver medal (in 2016) and two Commonwealth Games gold medals (in 2006 and 2010), as well as medals in various other competitions. As a cricketer, she represented the South African national team between 2000 and 2002, including at the 2000 World Cup in New Zealand.

Early life and cricket career
Viljoen was born in Rustenburg, Transvaal (present-day North West). She attended Die Hoërskool Rustenburg and her first language is Afrikaans. Viljoen made her international cricket debut for South Africa in June 2000, in a One Day International (ODI) match against England. She was 17 years and 10 days old at the time, becoming the youngest woman to play ODI cricket for South Africa (a record since broken by several others). Later in the year, Viljoen was selected in the South African squad for the 2000 Women's World Cup in New Zealand. A right-handed all-rounder, she appeared in all eight of her team's matches at the tournament, and against England scored 54 not out, which was to be the highest score of her ODI career. Against Ireland in a later match, she took 3/27 from ten overs, the best bowling figures of her international career. Viljoen's final international matches for South Africa came in March 2002, in a home series against India. She played four ODIs and the only Test match of her career, in which she scored 17 runs in the first innings and 71 in the second (the third-highest score of the match).

In December 2021, Viljoen made a return to cricket, joining Northerns with the aim of playing for her country again.

Athletics career

Viljoen won gold at the 2009 Summer Universiade in Belgrade, throwing 62.52 metres. At the qualifying round, she set a new African record 65.46 metres, eclipsing her compatriot Justine Robbeson's record 63.49m achieved in Potchefstroom in February 2008. Viljoen's throw was over three meters further than her previous PB of 62.24 m achieved also at the February 2008 meeting in Potchefstroom. On 14 June 2010, she broke her own record with 66.38 m at the Josef Odložil Memorial in Prague.

Viljoen won silver at the IAAF World Championships in Daegu, Korea on 2 September 2011. With a throw of 68.38m, she also set a new African record. She improved her own African record to 69.35m at the Adidas Grand Prix in New York City in June 2012 Having failed to reach the final at the 2004 and 2008 Summer Olympics, she finished fourth at the 2012 Summer Olympics, only 0.38 cm off the bronze medal-winning mark.

At the 2013 World Championships in Athletics, which was held in Moscow, Viljoen took only the 6th place with a mark of 63.58 meters. In 2014, she placed second at the Commonwealth Games. Later that year she won the African Championships with a result of 65.32m. Viljoen won a silver medal, coming in second to Israel's Marharyta Dorozhon, at the IAAF Diamond League Bislett Games in Oslo, Norway, on 11 June 2015.

Viljoen won the silver medal in the women's javelin at the 2016 Summer Olympics in Rio.

Competition record

References

External links
 
 
 

1983 births
Living people
Afrikaner people
South African people of Dutch descent
South African female javelin throwers
Athletes (track and field) at the 2004 Summer Olympics
Athletes (track and field) at the 2008 Summer Olympics
Athletes (track and field) at the 2012 Summer Olympics
Athletes (track and field) at the 2016 Summer Olympics
Olympic athletes of South Africa
Athletes (track and field) at the 2006 Commonwealth Games
Athletes (track and field) at the 2010 Commonwealth Games
Athletes (track and field) at the 2014 Commonwealth Games
Athletes (track and field) at the 2018 Commonwealth Games
Commonwealth Games gold medallists for South Africa
Commonwealth Games silver medallists for South Africa
Commonwealth Games medallists in athletics
South African women cricketers
South Africa women Test cricketers
South Africa women One Day International cricketers
North West women cricketers
Central Gauteng women cricketers
Limpopo women cricketers
Northerns women cricketers
World Athletics Championships medalists
People from Rustenburg
World Athletics Championships athletes for South Africa
South African LGBT sportspeople
LGBT cricketers
LGBT track and field athletes
Olympic silver medalists for South Africa
Medalists at the 2016 Summer Olympics
Olympic silver medalists in athletics (track and field)
African Games bronze medalists for South Africa
African Games medalists in athletics (track and field)
Universiade medalists in athletics (track and field)
Olympic female javelin throwers
Athletes (track and field) at the 2003 All-Africa Games
Athletes (track and field) at the 2007 All-Africa Games
Universiade gold medalists for South Africa
Athletes (track and field) at the 2019 African Games
Lesbian sportswomen
IAAF Continental Cup winners
South African Athletics Championships winners
Medalists at the 2009 Summer Universiade
Medalists at the 2011 Summer Universiade
Medallists at the 2006 Commonwealth Games
Medallists at the 2010 Commonwealth Games
Medallists at the 2014 Commonwealth Games
Medallists at the 2018 Commonwealth Games